The 2006 ABA National Finals brought together the best men's and women's basketball teams from the Waratah League, South East Australian Basketball League (SEABL), Queensland Australian Basketball League (QABL), Central Australian Basketball League (CABL) and Big V competitions for their shot at national glory, with the event held at the Broadmeadow Basketball Stadium in Newcastle, New South Wales.

Australia's largest basketball competition, the Australian Basketball Association (ABA), commenced in March with 116 teams competing across six states and territories (Victoria, New South Wales, Queensland, South Australia, Tasmania and ACT) culminating in the National Finals in September in Newcastle.

In a weekend of top-level basketball, the Geelong Supercats and Ballarat Miners were triumphant in the men's and women's finals. The 2006 ABA National Finals were hosted by Newcastle Basketball Association and Basketball New South Wales.

Tournament overview
The Geelong Supercats were back on top in 2006 with a comprehensive 94–80 triumph over the Dandenong Rangers in the men's Grand Final. Mark Leader's team played with a purpose, order and discipline that simply left their rivals with few solutions. The men from Dandenong looked in serious trouble down 53–40 at the half. However, the Rangers put their troubled zone defence away to start the second half and their shooters found some touch, in particular Grand Final MVP Ash Cannan (21 points & 19 rebounds). But so did Geelong's, and the teams simply traded baskets in the brightest scoring period of the game. Powerful offensive rebounding allowed Dandenong to hang on by a thread but try as they might the Rangers could not sufficiently upset the Supercats. At the final siren, the game's most controlled side relaxed their guard completely and the scenes of celebration were unrestrained. Jamal Brown top scored for the Supercats with 21 points, closely followed by Jason Reardon with 20 points.

The Ballarat Miners showed superb composure to claim back-to-back ABA National titles in 2006. They patiently whittled away at an 11-point Bendigo lead to grind out a 69–66 win. Ballarat centre Karen Ashby (24 points, 15 rebounds & 7 assists) was awarded the Grand Final MVP, with a measured performance, showing great poise throughout the game as Bendigo constantly double-teamed her. The Miners were sharp in their execution, getting consecutive baskets from a flex offence. Bendigo threw everything at Ballarat in the dying stages but the Miners hung on for the win and the title.

Participants
To qualify for the event, teams had to be crowned Champion of their respective Leagues. There were also a number of wildcard entries.

League champions

Wildcards

Results

Quarter-finals – men

Quarter-finals – women

Classification Games – men

Classification Games – women

Semi-finals – men

Semi-finals – women

Grand Finals

All-Star Five

Men
Grand Final MVP: Ash Cannan (Dandenong Rangers)

Women

References

External links
2006 ABA National Finals this weekend

Australian Basketball Association
ABA